The VPRO (stylized vPro; originally an acronym for) is a Dutch public broadcaster, which forms a part of the Dutch public broadcasting system. Founded in 1926 as a liberal Protestant broadcasting organization, it gradually became more social liberal than Protestant in the 1950s and 1960s, and the original meaning of the acronym was eventually dropped.

In 1967, VPRO was the first broadcaster in the Netherlands to show a nude woman – Phil Bloom – on national television. The VPRO is known for sometimes producing avant-garde programs, documentaries and films. The target audience of the VPRO consists mainly of highly educated and creative people (e.g. artists, designers, scientists).

Like all Dutch public broadcasters, VPRO does not have its own television channel. VPRO often collaborates with foreign broadcasting organizations such as WDR, the BBC and Arte.

Logos

Programming

Television
 Backlight (Tegenlicht)
 Beagle: In Darwin's wake (2009–2010)
 Draadstaal (2007–2009)
 Het Gat van Nederland (1972–1974)
 Hoepla (1967)
 De Hokjesman (2013–2016)
 Holland Sport (2003–2011)
 Van Kooten en de Bie (1974–1998)
Metropolis TV – the program sees correspondents from around the world reporting on life and culture in other countries. In 2010, the program was honored with a Tegel Award.
 Missie Aarde (2015)
 Noorderlicht 
 Pingu
Toren C
 Villa Achterwerk
 Zomergasten
 Zondag met Lubach
 De Avondshow met Arjen Lubach
 De dagshow met Keo

Radio
 3voor12
 Argos
 Het Gebouw
 The John Peel Show (1984–1986)
 OVT
 Radio Bergeijk
 Villa 65
 White Noise, Dave Clarke's weekly Techno show on 3FM (2006–2012)

Documentaries
 Big Fun in the Big Town, a 1986 documentary about Hip Hop Music, presented by Marcel Vanthilt, which has become a cult classic. It is credited with popularising hiphop in the Netherlands and was made available on DVD in 2012.
 A Glorious Accident, a 1993 documentary featuring several prominent scientists and philosophers, hosted by Wim Kayzer.

Radio sessions
 Pink Floyd's performance at the Concertgebouw in 1969, as part of their The Man and The Journey Tour, was recorded and broadcast on VPRO. This broadcast was heavily bootlegged in the following years but finally saw an official release in the 2016 box set The Early Years 1965–1972.
 Alternative rock band Nirvana played a VPRO session in 1991 that was released on various bootlegs.
 Post-rock band Godspeed You! Black Emperor played a VPRO session in 1998 featuring songs Moya and Steve Reich.

See also
Nederlandse Publieke Omroep (NPO)
Pillarization
AI Song Contest

References

External links

 
 YouTube: Dutch / English
 3voor12

Dutch public broadcasting organisations
Netherlands Public Broadcasting
Dutch-language television networks
Radio stations established in 1926
Television channels and stations established in 1967
1926 establishments in the Netherlands
1967 establishments in the Netherlands
Television station stubs
Radio station stubs